Vice Admiral Sarwar Jahan Nizam, ndu, psc, BN (born 1952) is the first ever Vice-Admiral and Ex-Chief of Staff for the Bangladesh Navy. He is preceded by Rear Admiral M Hasan Ali Khan ndc, psc, BN and succeeded by Vice Admiral Zahir Uddin Ahmed (ND) ndc, psc, BN

Early life

Nizam was born in the Anwara district of Chittagong in 1952. He joined the erstwhile Pakistan Navy as an officer cadet at the age of 18, and completed six months training at the Pakistan Military Academy in Kakul. In 1970 he joined the Pakistan Naval Academy in Karachi and was commissioned 1st into the Executive Branch of the Pakistan Navy and subsequently in Bangladesh Navy in 1973.

Nizam graduated from the Defence Services Command & Staff College in Dhaka in 1986 and from the National Defence University in Beijing, China in 1996. Other qualifications include a Communication Specialization Course with the Royal Navy and completion of a Senior Executive Course with the Asia Pacific Centre for Securities Studies in the United States.

Naval commands
Nizam has held command positions with most of the large vessels in the Bangladesh Navy, including three years as commander of the frigate BNS Umar Farooq, the largest naval vessel in Bangladesh service.

Nizam also held a range of staff command positions including that of the Flotilla Commander and Commodore Commanding Chittagong (COMCHIT). He also served as Assistant Chief of the Naval Staff (Operations) and Assistant Chief of the Naval Staff (Personnel) in Naval Headquarters.

On 10 February 2007 Nizam was sworn in as Naval Chief of Staff and was promoted to Vice-Admiral on 23 May of the same year. As Chief of Staff he has supported the introduction of new technology for the operation of naval vessels, and a modernisation of the ageing Bangladesh fleet.
In addition to his direct military duties, Nizam was Director General of the Bangladesh Coast Guard, in which role he commissioned the construction of the first locally built coast guard vessels. He was also  Chairman of the Naval Shipyard at Khulna, and President of the Bangladesh Swimming Federation.

Admiral Nizam came to normal retirement with effect from 29 January 2009 after ending his 36 years naval career.

Personal life
Admiral Nizam is married to Munira Nizam and the couple has one daughter, Nafeesa Hadi.

See also
 Military of Bangladesh
 Muhammad Shahid Sarwar

References

|-

Living people
1952 births
People from Anwara Upazila
Bangladeshi Navy admirals
Director Generals of Bangladesh Coast Guard
Chiefs of Naval Staff (Bangladesh)
Government Muslim High School alumni